Manaf Eid Abushgeer (born 5 February 1980) is a former professional footballer from Jeddah, Saudi Arabia. A full Saudi Arabian international, he plays for Al Ittihad in the left midfield position.

Most notably with Al-Ittihad, Abushgeer won the AFC Champions League consecutively in the years 2004 and 2005, and then went on to play with his team in the 2005 FIFA Club World Cup, finishing in 4th place.

Honours
Al-Ittihad
Saudi Premier League/Saudi Pro League: 1999–2000, 2000–01, 2002–03, 2006–07, 2008–09
King Cup: 2010
Crown Prince Cup: 2001, 2004
Saudi-Egyptian Super Cup: 2001, 2003
AFC Champions League: 2004, 2005
Arab Champions League: 2004–05

Saudi Arabia
Arabian Gulf Cup: 2003

References

1980 births
Living people
Saudi Arabian footballers
Saudi Arabia international footballers
Ittihad FC players
2011 AFC Asian Cup players
Sportspeople from Jeddah
Association football midfielders
Saudi Professional League players